Eight Days At Roundhead is an album by the New Zealand band The Exponents, released in 2013. Recorded at Roundhead Studios during the making of a documentary about the group, the album was produced by Neil Baldock and The Exponents in 2012 except "Geraldine" and "Or A Girl I Knew" which were produced by Neil Finn at Roundhead in Auckland in 2005. Eight Days At Roundhead was released in May 2013 as either a stand-alone digital album or as a bonus album packaged with Why Does Love Do This to Me: The Exponents Greatest Hits.

Track listing
"Social Life"
"Rural Town"
"It's An Early Winter"
"Walk Around The Roses"
"You Got Ten Minutes Now"
"Within Fields Without Me"
"I Can't Give You More"
"Caroline Skies"
"Geraldine"
"Or A Girl I Knew"

References 

2013 albums
The Exponents albums
Albums recorded at Roundhead Studios